Constantine of Armenia may refer to:

 Constantine I, Prince of Armenia (died 1102) 
 Constantine II, Prince of Armenia (died 1129) 
 Constantine I, King of Armenia (1278–1310), also sometimes called Constantine III of Armenia
 Constantine II, King of Armenia (1342–1344)
 Constantine of Baberon, 13th century father of King Hethoum I
 Constantine III, King of Armenia (died 1362), sometimes called Constantine V of Armenia
 Constantine IV, King of Armenia (died 1373), sometimes called Constantine VI of Armenia